Akseli Vilho Toivonen (6 April 1887 Hamina – 10 January 1954) was a Finnish architect. He graduated from Helsinki University of Technology in 1911. He had a major role in planning the Puu-Käpylä neighbourhood in Helsinki in the 1920s. Toivonen also worked as a treasurer of Helsingin kansanasunnot OY for some time. That was the company responsible for the construction of the buildings in Käpylä.

Notable work
Haminan pursipaviljonki (1909) 
People's house of Hamina (1912)
Puu-Käpylä (1920-1925)

References

1887 births
1954 deaths
Finnish architects